Séverine Desbouys (born 17 August 1974, in Vichy) is a road cyclist from France. She represented her nation at the 1998, 1999, 2000 and 2001 UCI Road World Championships.

References

External links
 profile at Procyclingstats.com

French female cyclists
Living people
1974 births
People from Vichy
Sportspeople from Allier
Cyclists from Auvergne-Rhône-Alpes